Sreemukhi (born 10 May 1993) is an Indian television presenter and actress who works in Telugu films and television. Sreemukhi started her career as a television host and made her film debut with a supporting role in Julai (2012). She later played the lead role in Prema Ishq Kaadhal (2012). Sreemukhi is one of the highest-paid personalities in Telugu television.

Early life and career 
Sreemukhi was born on 10 May 1993 in Nizamabad of present-day Telangana, India. She studied dentistry in her graduation. Before making her debut into films, Sreemukhi started her career with hosting a TV show Adhurs and also hosted the singing program Super Singer 9. Sreemukhi made her film debut as Raaji in Julai as Allu Arjun's sister under the direction of Trivikram Srinivas and Prema Ishq Kaadhal as lead actress in the direction of Pavan Sadineni. She also acted in Nenu Sailaja as the sister of Ram in movie as Swecha. The following year she did a small cameo in Sekhar Kammula's Life is Beautiful and was the lead actress in Dhanalakshmi Talupu Tadithey and Nara Rohit's Savitri. Along with these she also made her first feature film in Tamil, Ettuthikkum Madhayaanai paired opposite Sathya. Her 2015 KannadaTelugu bilingual film Chandrika, marked her debut in Kannada cinema.

In 2015, Sreemukhi co-hosted the South Indian International Movie Awards (SIIMA) in Dubai. She also hosted stand up comedy show Pataas for ETV Plus, Bhale Chance Le for Star Maa, and appeared in the film Gentleman. In 2019, she entered season 3 of Bigg Boss Telugu as a contestant where she finished as a runner up.

In 2021, Sreemukhi returned to cinema playing the lead in the film Crazy Uncles. A reviewer from The Times of India wrote, "Sreemukhi deserves better than a film that uses a ‘good message’ as an excuse to minimise her to nothing but a glam doll. She looks gorgeous as ever but the film offers her no scope to perform."

Filmography

Films
All films are in Telugu, unless otherwise noted.

Television

References

External links 
 

Living people
Actresses in Telugu cinema
Actresses in Tamil cinema
Bigg Boss (Telugu TV series) contestants
1993 births
People from Nizamabad, Telangana
Actresses from Telangana
Telugu television anchors

Indian television presenters
Actresses in Telugu television
Indian game show hosts
21st-century Indian actresses